The Vassås Bridge is a cantilever bridge that crosses the Osan fjord in the municipality of Bindal in Nordland county, Norway. The bridge is part of Norwegian County Road 1 and it connects the villages of Vassås and Terråk.

See also
List of bridges in Norway
List of bridges in Norway by length
List of bridges
List of bridges by length

References

Bindal
Road bridges in Nordland
Bridges completed in 1980
1980 establishments in Norway